Siemianowice Śląskie also known as Siemianowice is a city in Upper Silesia in southern Poland, near Katowice, in its central district in the Upper Silesian Metropolitan Union - a metropolis with a population of 2 million people and is located in the Silesian Highlands, on the Brynica river (tributary of the Vistula).

It is situated in the Silesian Voivodeship since its formation in 1999, previously in Katowice Voivodeship, and before then in the Autonomous Silesian Voivodeship. Siemianowice is one of the cities of the 2.7 million conurbation, the Katowice urban area, at the heart of the greater Silesian metropolitan area populated by about 5,294,000 people. The population of the city is 65,684 (2021). Siemianowice Śląskie borders four cities: Piekary Śląskie, Chorzów, Czeladź and the voivodeship capital Katowice.

Etymology
There are three hypothetical explanations for the origins of the name Siemianowice: either it comes from seven huts which were called Siedminowice/Siedmionowice in Old Polish; from the old legend about Siemion (Siemian), Michał and Maciej, or Siemion, Michał and Jakub; or it comes from ziemia nawa which means earth taken away from water.

Administrative division
 Centrum – 11,98 km2
 Michałkowice – 5,46 km2
 Bańgów – 2,96 km2
 Przełajka – 2,7 km2
 Bytków – 2,3 km2

History

Siemianowice dates back to medieval Piast-ruled Poland. It was probably first mentioned in documents in 1253.

In 1924, Siemianowice and Huta Laury communes were merged. The new city was named Siemianowice Śląskie and gained town privileges in 1932.

On September 1, 1939, the first day of the German invasion of Poland and World War II, there was a skirmish between German saboteurs and the Polish self-defense in the present-day district of Michałkowice. German saboteurs then entered the local mine, taking several dozen Polish miners as hostages. After a battle, Polish troops and volunteers, including members of the "Sokół" Polish Gymnastic Society and boy scouts, recaptured the mine. There were deaths on both sides, and the Poles also captured dozens of German saboteurs. The Germans eventually invaded and captured the city in the following days, and already on September 8, 1939, the German Freikorps murdered six Poles in the city. In September 1939, the German Einsatzgruppe I operated in the city and committed various crimes against the Polish population. During the German occupation, two forced labour camps were established and operated in the city: one for Poles (Polenlager) and one for Jews. In April 1944, the Germans also established a subcamp of the Auschwitz concentration camp, in which over 900 people were held and subjected to forced labour. In January 1945, the prisoners of the subcamp were taken to the Mauthausen concentration camp, and shortly afterwards the Germans left the city and the occupation ended.

In 1951, Michałkowice, Bytków, Bańgów and Przełajka were included within the city limits of Siemianowice as new districts.

Industry
 Adient (Car Parts Manufacturing)
 Arcelor Mittal (Steel Manufacturing)
 Fastening Elements Factory (Fastening Hardware Manufacturing)
 Rosomak S.A. (Defence Systems)
 Fabud (Building Company)
 Huhtamäki (Specialty Packaging Products)

Notable architectural structures

 Bytków TV Tower
 Park Tradycji ("Tradition Park") at the old coal mine
 Municipal Museum in an old granary
 Municipal Bath
 Palace of the Mieroszewskis and Donnersmarcks
 Zameczek Palace (Rheinbaben Palace)
 Town hall
 Saint Michael Archangel church
 Holy Cross church
 Siemianowice Culture Center
 Brewery

Parks and squares
 Park Miejski ("Municipal Park")
 Park Górnik ("Miner Park")
 Park Pszczelnik
 Planty Michałkowickie
 Skwer Laury ("Laura Square")
 Plac Wolności ("Freedom Square")

Sports
The local football club is MKS Siemianowiczanka. It competes in the lower leagues.

Notable people

Hugo Henckel von Donnersmarck (1811–1890), German industrialist, founder of Laurahütte
Ernst Steinitz (1871–1928, German mathematician
Wojciech Korfanty (1873–1939), Polish politician
Otto Josef Schlein (1895–1944), German physician
Michael Jary (1906–1988), German composer
Heinz A. Lowenstam (1912–1993) German-born, Jewish-American paleoecologist
Antoni Halor (1937–2011), Polish film director, artist, writer
Witold Ziaja (born 1940), Polish field hockey player
Zygmunt Maszczyk (born 1945), Polish footballer
Józef Skrzek (born 1948), musician, leader of SBB band
Barbara Blida (1949–2007), Polish politician
Bronisław Korfanty (born 1952), Polish senator
Apostolis Anthimos (born 1954), musician
Henryk Średnicki (1955–2016), Olympic boxer
Krzysztof Globisz (born 1957), Polish actor
Daniel Podrzycki (1963–2005), Polish politician
Jacek Fröhlich (born 1965), Automotive Designer, BMW exterior design chief
Kryspin Hermański (born 1984), Polish dancer
Kajetan Duszyński (born 1995), Polish sprinter, Olympic medallist

Twin towns – sister cities

Siemianowice Śląskie is twinned with:

 Câmpia Turzii, Romania
 Jablunkov, Czech Republic
 Köthen, Germany
 Mohács, Hungary
 Wattrelos, France

References

 This article may be expanded with text translated from the corresponding article in the Polish Wikipedia (December 2008)

External links
 Jewish Community in Siemianowice Śląskie on Virtual Shtetl
 Sights
 Old photos

 
City counties of Poland
Cities and towns in Silesian Voivodeship
Silesian Voivodeship (1920–1939)
Nazi war crimes in Poland